Aberdeen F.C. competed in the Scottish Premier Division, Scottish League Cup, Scottish Cup and UEFA Europa League in season 1994–95.

Results

Scottish Premier Division

Final standings

Relegation play-offs

Scottish League Cup

Scottish Cup

UEFA Cup

Skonto win on away goals

References

 afcheritage.org 

Aberdeen F.C. seasons
Aberdeen